Algeria competed at the 2000 Summer Olympics in Sydney, Australia. 47 competitors, 37 men and 10 women, took part in 42 events across 10 sports.

Medalists

| width="100%" align="left" valign="top" |

| width="30%" align="left" valign="top" |

Athletics

Men
Track and road events

Field events

Women
Track & road events

Field events

Combined events – Heptathlon

Boxing

Men

Fencing

Judo

Men

Women

Rowing

Qualification Legend: FA=Final A (medal); FB=Final B (non-medal); FC=Final C (non-medal); FD=Final D (non-medal); FE=Final E (non-medal); FF=Final F (non-medal); SA/B=Semifinals A/B; SC/D=Semifinals C/D; SE/F=Semifinals E/F; R=Repechage

Swimming

Table tennis

Trampolining

Weightlifting

Wrestling

Men's Greco-Roman

See also
 Algeria at the 2000 Summer Paralympics

Notes
Wallechinsky, David (2004). The Complete Book of the Summer Olympics (Athens 2004 Edition). Toronto, Canada. . 
International Olympic Committee (2001). The Results. Retrieved 12 November 2005.
Sydney Organising Committee for the Olympic Games (2001). Official Report of the XXVII Olympiad Volume 1: Preparing for the Games. Retrieved 20 November 2005.
Sydney Organising Committee for the Olympic Games (2001). Official Report of the XXVII Olympiad Volume 2: Celebrating the Games. Retrieved 20 November 2005.
Sydney Organising Committee for the Olympic Games (2001). The Results. Retrieved 20 November 2005.
International Olympic Committee Website

References

Nations at the 2000 Summer Olympics
2000
Summer Olympics